Yury Velikorodnykh (born 18 February 1942) is a Soviet long-distance runner. He competed in the marathon at the 1972 Summer Olympics and the 1976 Summer Olympics.

References

1942 births
Living people
Athletes (track and field) at the 1972 Summer Olympics
Athletes (track and field) at the 1976 Summer Olympics
Soviet male long-distance runners
Soviet male marathon runners
Olympic athletes of the Soviet Union
Sportspeople from Perm Krai